Nestinari Nunataks (Nestinarski Nunatatsi \ne-sti-'nar-ski 'nu-na-ta-tsi\) are a pair of rocky peaks of elevation 470 m and 520 m in middle Huron Glacier, Livingston Island in the South Shetland Islands, Antarctica.  Situated in the north foothills of Tangra Mountains, 210 m away from each other.

They are named after the Greco-Bulgarian folkloric ritual of ‘Nestinari’ involving barefoot dancing on live embers.

Location

Maps
 L.L. Ivanov et al. Antarctica: Livingston Island and Greenwich Island, South Shetland Islands. Scale 1:100000 topographic map. Sofia: Antarctic Place-names Commission of Bulgaria, 2005.
 L.L. Ivanov. Antarctica: Livingston Island and Greenwich, Robert, Snow and Smith Islands. Scale 1:120000 topographic map.  Troyan: Manfred Wörner Foundation, 2009.  
 Antarctic Digital Database (ADD). Scale 1:250000 topographic map of Antarctica. Scientific Committee on Antarctic Research (SCAR). Since 1993, regularly upgraded and updated.
 L.L. Ivanov. Antarctica: Livingston Island and Smith Island. Scale 1:100000 topographic map. Manfred Wörner Foundation, 2017.

References

 Nestinari Nuntaks. SCAR Composite Gazetteer of Antarctica
 Bulgarian Antarctic Gazetteer. Antarctic Place-names Commission. (details in Bulgarian, basic data in English)

External links
 Nestinari Nunatak. Copernix satellite image

Nunataks of Livingston Island